TenTemPiés is an international collective of musicians based in Amsterdam, Netherlands. Formed during the summer of 2008, their music is an energetic blend of Latin rock with ska and reggae.

Discography

Albums 
 A Mi Propio Paso (2017)
 Rebelucionario (Patiperro Records / PIAS Rough Trade, 2014)
 Canto Para Gritar (Patiperro Records, 2011)

EP's 
 A Casa Tierra (Patiperro Records, 2013)
 Por Ahora (Patiperro Records, 2010)
 TenTemPiés (Patiperro Records, 2009)

Singles 
 Dame Tu Mano (Patiperro Records / PIAS Rough Trade, 2014)
 Quiero Saltar (Patiperro Records, 2014)
 Nada Te Pido (Patiperro Records, 2013)
 Que Sera (Patiperro Records, 2012)
 Leon (Patiperro Records, 2011)

External links 
 Official website
 

Musical groups from Amsterdam
Latin music groups
Dutch reggae musical groups
Dutch rock music groups
Dutch ska groups